Charlène Le Corvaisier (born 10 June 1990) is a French female canoeist who won four medals at individual senior level at the Wildwater Canoeing World Championships and European Wildwater Championships.

References

External links
 

1990 births
Living people
French female canoeists
Place of birth missing (living people)